Eric Shea (born February 14, 1960) is an American former child actor. Active from age six through seventeen, he is best known for his roles in the feature films Yours, Mine and Ours (1968) and The Poseidon Adventure (1972), as well as his numerous guest-starring appearances throughout the 1960s and 1970s on such popular television series as Batman, Gunsmoke, The Flying Nun, Nanny and the Professor, The Brady Bunch, and Little House on the Prairie, among others.

Shea's brothers Christopher and Stephen each voiced Linus van Pelt for the Peanuts TV animation specials in the 1960s and 1970s, respectively.

Filmography

Bibliography
 Holmstrom, John. The Moving Picture Boy: An International Encyclopaedia from 1895 to 1995. Norwich, Michael Russell, 1996, p. 331.

External links

1960 births
Male actors from Los Angeles
American male child actors
American male film actors
American male television actors
Living people
20th-century American male actors